Louis-René des Forêts (January 28, 1918 – December 31, 2001) was a French writer.

Life 
Des Forêts's only novel, The Beggars (Les Mendiants) was published by Éditions Gallimard in 1943.The rest of his works include shorter narratives, among which his best known work, Le Bavard, and poetry.  His work has been commented on by authors such as Maurice Blanchot or Yves Bonnefoy.

In 1954, Des Forêts co-founded a committee against the Algerian war, with Dionys Mascolo, Edgar Morin and Robert Antelme.
In 1967, he co-founded the literary journal L'Éphémère with writers Yves Bonnefoy, André du Bouchet, Paul Celan, Jacques Dupin, Michel Leiris and others.

Des Forêts received several literary prizes in France and Belgium. He was awarded the Grand prix national des Lettres for the entirety of his work in 1997.

Des Forêts was also a painter.

Works translated in English
The Beggars, novel, translated by Helen Beauclerk
 The Children’s room, short stories, tr. Jean Stewart, John Calder Lt., 1963 (Includes the English translation of Le Bavard)
 Poems of Samuel Wood, tr. Anthony Barnett
 Ostinato, tr. Mary Ann Caws

On Des Forêts’s work 
 "Third person singular", Harry Guest, 17 July 1998, Times Literary Supplement, Literature & Poetry
"French Literature", John Taylor, 14 April 2003, Times Literary Supplement, Literature & Poetry

Notes and references 

1918 births
2001 deaths
French male poets
20th-century French poets
20th-century French male writers